Jesse Lee Kercheval (born 1956) is a poet, memoirist, translator and fiction writer. She is an emeritus professor at the University of Wisconsin–Madison. She is the author of numerous books, notably Building Fiction, The Museum of Happiness, Space and Underground Women.

Biography
Kercheval was born in Fontainebleau, France, to American parents. Raised in Cocoa, Florida, she attended Florida State University in Tallahassee, Florida, where she studied with Janet Burroway, David Kirby, and Jerome Stern. She received her Bachelor of Arts in history at the university in 1983.

Kercheval earned her Master of Fine Arts in Creative Writing from the Iowa Writers' Workshop in 1986. She then taught at DePauw University in Indiana for a year.

Since 1987, she was a professor of English at the University of Wisconsin in Madison. She was the founding director of the Master of Fine Arts Program in Creative Writing, the Zona Gale Professor of English, and the director of the Wisconsin Institute for Creative Writing. She lives in Wisconsin.

Short stories
Kercheval's first published book was a collection of short stories named The Dogeater. The stories include The Dogeater, Underground Women,  Willy,  A Clean House,  Tertiary Care,  La Mort au Moyen Age,  The History of the Church in America, and A History of Indiana. It is now out of print.

The short story The Dogeater is about an Igorrote man who lived in New Orleans. He was brought to the United States for the 1904 St. Louis World's Fair.

Underground Women was expanded into Kercheval's later novel, The Museum of Happiness. Kercheval got the idea for Underground Women after seeing a woman collapse in a launderette during a trip to Paris.

Kercheval also composed a one-page short short story, Carpathia. Published in Chapter 11 of her textbook Building Fiction. It is the story of two passengers on board the Carpathia, the ship that rescued passengers from the Titanic.

Novels
The Museum of Happiness is a story about a young widow and a half-Alsatian, half-German carnival worker as they fall in love in a 1929 Paris. A German translation was published by Wilhelm Heyne Verlag in 1997. It was reissued by the University of Wisconsin Press.

The Alice Stories is about a girl called Alice and her family. She falls in love with Anders Dahl, a Norwegian farmer. Then, their child Maude was born. The novel goes through her life and her biggest challenges.

My Life as a Silent Movie centers around the life of 42-year-old Emma, who flies to Paris after losing her husband and daughter in an auto accident. She then discovers that she has a twin brother whose existence she had not known about, and learns that her birth parents weren't the Americans who raised her, but a White Russian film star of the 1920s and a French Stalinist. The novel won the 2013 Edna Ferber Fiction Book Award from the Council for Wisconsin Writers.

Nonfiction
Space is Kercheval's memoir about her childhood and the Space Race. It was published by Algonquin Books.

The writing textbook Building Fiction:How to Develop Plot and Structure was published in 1997, by Story Press, and reissued by the University of Wisconsin-Madison Press. It discusses sources for fiction, openings, points-of-view, characters and endings. It also discusses novels, novellas, novels-in-stories and short stories.

Poetry
Kercheval has published three collections of poetry. The first was World as Dictionary, published by Carnegie Mellon University Press. The second, Dog Angel, was published by the University of Pittsburgh Press. The third, Cinema Muto was published by Southern Illinois University Press and is about the silent film era. She is also the author of two chapbooks: Chartreuse, published by Hollyridge Press, and Film History as a Train Wreck published by the Center for Book Arts in New York.

Since 2011 she has also been writing poems in Spanish which have appeared in literary magazines.

Translations
Kercheval has published translations from Spanish of the Uruguayan poets Circe Maia, Agustín Lucas, Tatiana Oroño and Idea Vilariño. She has edited a bilingual anthology titled América invertida: an anthology of emerging Uruguayan poets.

Awards
Her memoir, Space, won the Alex Award from the American Library Association. The Dogeater won the Associated Writing Programs Award 1986 in Short Fiction.  The Alice Stories won the Prairie Schooner Fiction Book Prize. Her novella, Brazil, was the winner of the Ruthanne Wiley Memorial Novella Contest. David Wojahn selected her poetry collection Cinema Muto for the Crab Orchard Open Selection Award. The 2006 Center for Book Arts Poetry Chapbook Prize, judged by Albert Goldbarth, was won by her chapbook, Film History as a Train Wreck.

Works (as author, translator, or editor)
The Dogeater (1987)
The Museum of Happiness (1993)
Building Fiction: How To Develop Plot and Structure (1997) 
Space: A Memoir (1998)
World as Dictionary (1999)
Dog Angel (2004)
Chartreuse (2005)
Film History as Train Wreck (2006)
The Alice Stories (2007)
Cinema Muto (2009)
Brazil (2010)
My Life as a Silent Movie (2013)
Torres/Towers (2014)
Extranjera = Stranger (2015)  and 
The invisible bridge = El puente invisible (2015) 
América invertida: An Anthology of Emerging Uruguayan Poets (2016) 
Tierra, cielo y agua: antología de poesía medio ambiental = Earth, water and sky: an anthology of environmental poetry (2016) 
Confiado a un amplio aire = Trusting on the Wide Air (2019)
Underground Women (2019)
Jabko (2019)
America that island off the coast of France (2019)
Volver en tinta = Reborn in Ink (2019)
Fábula de un hombre desconsolado = Fable of an Inconsolable Man (2019)
Mis Razones: mujeres poetas del Uruguay (2019)
Year by Year: a life (2019)
Confiado a un amplio aire = Trusting on the Wide Air (2019)
Poemas de Amor = Love Poems (2020)
Naturaleza muerta con derrotas = Still Life With Defeats (2020)
Noite nu Norte = Night in the North (2020)
La voz y la sombra = Voice and Shadow (2020)
Still life with defeats = Naturaleza muerta con derrotas (2020)
La crisis es el cuerpo (2021)
I Want to Tell You (2023)
Memoria y Reescritura = Memory Rewritten (2023)

References

1956 births
Living people
20th-century American novelists
21st-century American novelists
American women short story writers
American women poets
American women novelists
Florida State University alumni
Spanish–English translators
University of Wisconsin–Madison faculty
Novelists from Florida
20th-century American women writers
21st-century American women writers
20th-century American poets
21st-century American poets
20th-century American translators
21st-century American translators
Chapbook writers
20th-century American short story writers
21st-century American short story writers
People from Cocoa, Florida
Novelists from Wisconsin
American women academics
Women memoirists